Raphitoma maculosa is a species of sea snail, a marine gastropod mollusk in the family Raphitomidae.

This is a taxon inquirendum. It may be a divergent form of Raphitoma bicolor (Risso, 1826)

Distribution
This marine species occurs off Norway.

References

 Høisæter T. (2016). A taxonomic review of the Norwegian species of Raphitoma (Gastropoda: Conoidea: Raphitomidae). Fauna Norvegica. 36: 9-32

External links

maculosa
Gastropods described in 2016